The Museum of Pizza was a pop-up exhibition, or "selfie museum", of pizza-themed art that took place in Brooklyn, New York, from October 13 to November 16, 2018. The Museum of Pizza, otherwise known as MoPi, hosted over 25,000 people in its six-week run. The Museum of Pizza featured artwork by over 25 different artists, including large-scale pizza-inspired custom installations by Adam Green, Shawna-x, Signe Pierce and Emma Stern, Gazoo To The Moon, and more. A group show titled "The Psychedelic Pizza Parlor" was curated by RJ Supa of Yours, Mine, and Ours Gallery (located in downtown Manhattan) and featured work from Sarah Bahbah, Hein Kohn, Adam Parker Smith. Andrew W.K.'s custom pizza guitar was also on display. The Museum also displayed 70 pizza boxes from Scott Wiener's Guinness World Record holding pizza box collection.

The Museum of Pizza was produced by Brooklyn-based media company Nameless Network. Kareem Rahma was inspired by a cave system in Lebanon, which served as the inspiration for the Museum's "Cheese Cave" exhibit.   

A preview party was held at the New Museum.

References

Further reading 

 
 
 
 
 
 

Art exhibitions in the United States
Pizza
October 2018 events in the United States
Art in New York City
Pizza in New York City
2018 in New York City